Dessaulles is a French Canadian surname. Notable people with the surname include:

 Georges-Casimir Dessaulles (1827–1930), businessman, statesman, and Canadian senator 
 Jean Dessaulles (1766–1835), seigneur and political figure in Lower Canada
 Louis-Antoine Dessaulles (1818–1895), Quebec seigneur, journalist, and political figure